John Bowers or Johnathan Bowers may refer to:

John Bowers (actor) (1885–1936), American stage and silent film actor
John Bowers (bishop) (1854–1926), Anglican bishop of Thetford
John Bowers (cricketer) (born 1996), English cricketer
John Bowers (diplomat) (1912–2004), Sudan Political Service mystic who worked for UNESCO
John Bowers (lawyer) (born 1956), Principal of Brasenose College, Oxford
John Bowers (loudspeaker builder) (1923–1987), British HiFi pioneer
John Bowers (writer) (born 1928), American writer and academic
John M. Bowers (1772–1846), U.S. Representative from New York
John C. Bowers (1811–1873), African American entrepreneur, organist and vestryman
John E. Bowers, American physicist, engineer, researcher and educator

See also
Jack Bowers (1908–1970), Derby County, Leicester City and England footballer
John Bower (disambiguation)